Phoenix Press may refer to:
 Phoenix Books, a paperback imprint of the Orion Publishing Group
 Phoenix Books or Phoenix Press, a paperback imprint of Weidenfeld & Nicolson; in turn of Orion Publishing Group from 1991 or soon after; in turn of Hachette Livre and thus Lagardère Group from 1998